Andrei Cristian Gorcea (born 2 August 2001) is a Romanian professional footballer who plays as a goalkeeper for Liga I club Universitatea Cluj.

Club career
Gorcea made his Liga I debut for Universitatea Cluj on 17 July 2022, in a 1–1 draw to FCSB.

References

External links
 
 

2001 births
Living people
Sportspeople from Cluj-Napoca
Romanian footballers
Association football goalkeepers
Liga I players
Liga II players
FC Universitatea Cluj players